"Crazy About My Baby" is a boogie woogie song, first recorded by Blind Roosevelt Graves in 1929.  It was perhaps the first recorded to contain all elements of what would come to be called rock and roll, and has been described as the first song of that genre.

Historic song
Rock and roll evolved gradually out of boogie woogie, itself a fusion of blues, early ragtime-style jazz, religious and dance music like honky tonk. "Crazy About My Baby" contained all key elements of 1950s rock and roll, over two decades earlier. For example, it is a song with accelerated blues guitar riffs and a danceable back beat, recognized as foreshadowing Chuck Berry compositions. It is therefore on a short list along with "Pinetop's Boogie Woogie" (which coined the name for the genre) as "the first rock and roll recording".

In 1929, Le Moise "Blind Roosevelt" Graves and his brother Uaroy began recording boogie woogie music, a style that had acquired its name from the Pinetop song a year earlier. Among their early songs are the first known recording of "Guitar Boogie", and "Crazy About My Baby". They were generally credited either as "Blind Roosevelt Graves and Brother" or the "Mississippi Jook Band".

The song is in the "blues in B flat" mode typical of 1950s rock, with Graves on guitar and vocals, session musician William Ezell on piano, Graves' brother playing tambourine, and Baby Jay James playing cornet.

References

Boogie-woogie songs
1929 songs
Rock-and-roll songs